Lotnicze Pogotowie Ratunkowe is an air ambulance service subordinate to the Minister of Health of Poland. The Independent Public Health Care Institution Aviation Rescue Service was established in 2000. Additionally, the Search and rescue services in the Tatra Mountains located on the southern border with Slovakia are provided by Tatrzańskie Ochotnicze Pogotowie Ratunkowe with the PZL W-3 Sokół aircraft.

Aircraft
17 Eurocopter EC135 P2+
10 Eurocopter EC135 P3
3 Tecnam P2008 JC MkII
2 Bombardier Learjet 75 Liberty
2 Robinson R44 Raven II
1 Piaggio P.180 Avanti
1 Piaggio P.180 Avanti II

Structure
The LPR in Poland includes HEMS (Helicopter Emergency Medical Service, pol. Śmigłowcowa Służba Ratownictwa Medycznego). Currently, the LPR has 21 permanent bases and 1 seasonal base.

The bases of the Helicopter Emergency Medical Service are located in the following locations:
 Białystok – Białystok-Krywlany Airport – codename Ratownik 1; (EC 135); 7:00-20:00
 Bydgoszcz – Bydgoszcz-Szwederowo Airport – codename Ratownik 2; (EC 135); VFR day
 Gdańsk – Gdańsk im. Lecha Wałęsy Airport – codename Ratownik 3; (EC 135); 24 hours a day
 Katowice – Katowice-Muchowiec Airport – codename Ratownik 4; (EC 135); 7:00-20:00
 Gorzów Wielkopolski - Gorzów Wlkp.-Szpital Airport - codename Ratownik 24; (EC 135); VFR day
 Kielce – Kielce-Masłów Airport – codename Ratownik 5; (EC 135); VFR day
 Koszalin – Koszalin-Zegrze Pomorskie Airport - codename Ratownik 22 - seasonal base – (EC 135); VFR day
 Kraków – Kraków-Balice – codename Ratownik 6; (EC 135); 24 hours a day
 Lublin – Lublin-Radawiec Airport – codename Ratownik 7; (EC 135); 7:00-20:00
 Łódź – Łódź-Lublinek – codename Ratownik 16; (EC 135); 7:00-20:00
 Olsztyn – Gryźliny Airport – codename Ratownik 8; (EC 135); 7:00-20:00
 Opole –Opole-Polska Nowa Wieś Airport – codename Ratownik 23; (EC 135); VFR day
 Ostrów Wielkopolski – Ostrów Wielkopolski-Michałków Airport - codename Ratownik 21; (EC 135); VFR day
 Płock – Płock Airport – codename Ratownik 18; (EC 135); VFR day
 Poznań – Poznań-Ławica – codename Ratownik 9; (EC 135); 7:00-20:00
 Sanok – Sanok-Baza Airport – codename Ratownik 10; (EC 135); 7:00-20:00
 Sokołów Podlaski – Sokołów Podlaski Airport – codename Ratownik 19; (EC 135); VFR day
 Suwałki – Suwałki Airport – codename Ratownik 17; (EC 135); 7:00-20:00
 Szczecin –Szczecin-Goleniów Airport – codename Ratownik 11; (EC 135); 7:00 do 20:00
 Warszawa – Babice Airport – codename Ratownik 12; (EC 135); 24 hours a day
 Wrocław – Wrocław-Strachowice Airport – codename Ratownik 13; (EC 135); 24 hours a day
 Zielona Góra – Zielona Góra-Przylep Airport – codename Ratownik 15; (EC 135); 7:00-20:00

See also
 Air ambulances in the United Kingdom
 Emergency medical services in Poland

References

External links

 Polish Medical Air Rescue

Emergency medical services in Poland
Aviation in Poland